Kalev Chocolate Team was an Estonian UCI Continental cycling team that existed from 2004 to 2010.

Major wins
2006
 Tallinn–Tartu GP, Janek Tombak
2009
  Latvian National Road Race Championships, Oļegs Meļehs

References

Cycling teams established in 2004
Cycling teams disestablished in 2010
Cycling teams based in Estonia